Aydınköy can refer to:

 Aydınköy, Osmancık
 the Turkish name for Prastio, Nicosia